The 1967 Stanley Cup Finals was the championship series of the National Hockey League's (NHL) 1966–67 season, and the culmination of the 1967 Stanley Cup playoffs. A best-of-seven series, it was contested between the Montreal Canadiens and the Toronto Maple Leafs. The Maple Leafs won the series four games to two. In doing so, they won their thirteenth Stanley Cup championship. To date, this is Toronto's last appearance in the Stanley Cup Finals and they have the longest-active championship drought in the NHL at 54 (not including 2004–05 lockout) seasons. The 1967 Stanley Cup Finals was also the last Stanley Cup Finals in the Original Six Era. This was also the last all-Canadian Finals series until 1986.

Paths to the Finals

This was the last Stanley Cup before the 1967 expansion which meant there were only two rounds and three series in total were played in the playoffs. Montreal defeated New York to advance to the finals and Toronto defeated Chicago.

Game summaries
The average age of the Leafs' players was 31, the oldest lineup to win the Cup. Johnny Bower was 42 and Allan Stanley was 41. Dave Keon won the Conn Smythe Trophy.

Montreal won the opener 6–2 Toronto. For the second game, Terry Sawchuk was replaced with Bower and provided the Leafs with a shutout win, 3–0. Bower was in net for game three and won 3–2 on Bob Pulford's overtime goal. This game has been described as "one of the most exciting games ever played".

Bower was injured before game four and Sawchuk had to replace him. Al Smith was called up from the minors to serve as back-up for the fourth and fifth games. The Canadiens defeated the Leafs 6–2 again, this time in Toronto to even the series. Sawchuk would play well in the next two games, backstopping the Leafs to the Cup.

In the sixth game Bower returned to the line-up as back up. Jim Pappin scored his seventh goal of the playoffs and Sawchuk stopped 41 shots helping Toronto win the Cup. Pappin had four goals and four assists in the final series. Captain George Armstrong scored the 3–1 empty-net insurance goal to put game six out of reach.

Stanley Cup engraving
The 1967 Stanley Cup was presented to Maple Leafs captain George Armstrong by NHL President Clarence Campbell following the Maple Leafs 3–1 win over the Canadiens in game six.

The following Maple Leafs players and staff had their names engraved on the Stanley Cup.

1966–67 Toronto Maple Leafs

Won all 4 Stanley Cups in 6 Years with Toronto 1962, 1963, 1964, 1967
George Armstrong, Bob Baun, Johnny Bower, Larry Hillman, Tim Horton, Red Kelly, Dave Keon, Frank Mahovlich, Bob Pulford, Eddie Shack, Allan Stanley (11 players), Stafford Smythe, Harold Ballard, John Bassett, Punch Imlach, King Clancy, Bob Haggert, Tom Nayler (7 non-players), Bob Davidson, Karl Elieff (were part of all 4 cups, but were not included on the cup each season.)

See also
 1966–67 NHL season

Notes

References

 
 
 
 

 
Stanley Cup
Montreal Canadiens games
Toronto Maple Leafs games
Stanley Cup Finals
Ice hockey competitions in Montreal
Ice hockey competitions in Toronto
Stanley Cup
Stanley Cup
1960s in Montreal
1967 in Quebec
Stanley Cup